The Kola Superdeep Borehole SG-3
is the result of a scientific drilling project of the Soviet Union in the Pechengsky District, near the Russian border with Norway, on the Kola Peninsula. The project attempted to drill as deep as possible into the Earth's crust.
 
Drilling began on 24 May 1970 using the Uralmash-4E, and later the Uralmash-15000 series drilling rig, and it became the deepest manmade hole in history in 1979. The  diameter boreholes were drilled by branching from a central hole. The deepest reached  in 1989, the deepest human-made hole on Earth, and remains so .
 
In terms of true vertical depth, it remains the deepest borehole in the world.

Drilling

Drilling began on 24 May 1970 using the Uralmash-4E, a serial drilling rig used for drilling oil wells. The rig was slightly modified to be able to reach a  depth.

In October 1982, the first hole reached , and the second hole was started in January 1983 from a  depth of the first hole.

In 1983, the drill passed  in the second hole, and drilling was stopped for about a year for numerous scientific and celebratory visits to the site.

Drilling was restarted in September 1986,  from the first hole.

The third hole reached  in 1989.

During the drilling process, unexpectedly no basaltic layers were found at seven kilometers down or at any depth in the borehole.  Prior to that, geological information about the earth's crust was mostly based on analyzing seismic waves that indicated discontinuity.  Scientific models had previously suggested basalt should be seen.  Instead, the actual geological evidence from the borehole revealed there were more granites, and at much greater depths than scientists had considered.  It was then thought by scientists that seismic discontinuity was caused by granite metamorphosis instead of basalts. In addition to this, water was unexpectedly found at three to six kilometers deep.  Water was not naturally vaporizing at any depth in the borehole. Instead, water was found at these greater depths. Scientific models previously had not predicted water to be found at such great depths.  It was discovered that deep granites can be fractured and receive water this deep. As a result of these findings, many scientists now theorize that aquifers of water can be found at much greater depths than older scientific models had previously thought possible.

Research
The project has been a site of extensive geophysical examinations. The stated areas of study were the deep structure of the Baltic Shield, seismic discontinuities and the thermal regime in the Earth's crust, the physical and chemical composition of the deep crust and the transition from upper to lower crust, lithospheric geophysics, and to create and develop technologies for deep geophysical study.

Instead, the change in the seismic wave velocity is caused by a metamorphic transition in the granite rock. In addition, the rock at that depth had been thoroughly fractured and was saturated with water, which was surprising. This water, unlike surface water, must have come from deep-crust minerals and had been unable to reach the surface because of a layer of impermeable rock.

Another unexpected discovery was a large quantity of hydrogen gas. The drilling mud that flowed out of the hole was described as "boiling" with hydrogen.

In 1992, an international geophysical experiment obtained a reflection seismic crustal cross-section through the well. The Kola-92 working group consisted of researchers from the universities of Glasgow and Edinburgh in Scotland, the University of Wyoming in the United States, and the University of Bergen in Norway, as well as several Russian earth science research institutions.
The experiment was documented in a video recorded by Professor David Smythe,
which shows the drilling deck in action during an attempt to recover a tool dropped down the hole.

Status

The drilling terminated in 1995 due to a lack of funds. The scientific team was transferred to the federal state unitary subsidiary enterprise "Kola Superdeep", reduced and reoriented to a thorough study of the exposed section. In 2007, the scientific team was dissolved and the equipment was transferred to a private company and partially liquidated.

In 2008, the company was liquidated due to unprofitability, and the site was abandoned. The site is still visited by curious sightseers, who have reported that the structure over the borehole has been partially destroyed or removed.

Similar projects
 The United States had embarked on a similar project in 1957, dubbed Project Mohole, which was intended to penetrate the shallow crust under the Pacific Ocean off of Mexico. After initial drilling, the project was abandoned in 1966 when funding was cut off. This program inspired the Ocean Drilling Program, Integrated Ocean Drilling Program, and the present International Ocean Discovery Program.
Its ambitious measuring program used high-temperature logging tools that were upgraded specifically for KTB.

Records
The Kola Superdeep Borehole was the longest and deepest borehole in the world from 1989 to 2008.

In terms of depth below the surface, the Kola Superdeep Borehole SG-3 retains the world record at  reached in 1989 and is still the deepest artificial point on Earth.

See also
 , deep oceanic drilling ship, which achieved a subsea drilling record in 2012
 , covers the lowest point on land
 
 
 
 
 
 
 
 Vertical seismic profile — relevant seismic measurements
  - observed since 1995

Notes

References

Further reading

External links

 Official Kola Superdeep Borehole website 
 The World's Deepest Hole – Alaska Science Forum – July 1985
 The Deepest Hole 20 June 2006
 Kola Superdeep – Scientific research results and experiences by PhD A. Osadchikh 1984 
 Photo report on a trip to the Kola superdeep well in 2017. Many photos of the current state. 

Structure of the Earth
Buildings and structures in Murmansk Oblast
Science and technology in Russia
Science and technology in the Soviet Union
Deepest boreholes
1970 establishments in the Soviet Union
Cancelled projects
Earth's crust